Haplochromis victorianus is a species of cichlid endemic to Lake Victoria though it may now be extinct.  This species reaches a length of  SL.

References

victorianus
Fish of Lake Victoria
Fish described in 1904
Taxonomy articles created by Polbot